Kambsdalur is a suburb of Fuglafjørður on the Faroe Islands.

It was settled on 5 October 1985 in the valley "Ytri Dalur" which is both a part of Eystur municipality and Fuglafjørður municipality. Nevertheless, the village of Kambsdalur only covers the Fuglafjørður-part of "Ytri Dalur", which was bought by the Fuglafjarðar kommuna in 1981. There is a high school in Kambsdalur.

References 

Populated places in the Faroe Islands
Populated places established in 1985
Valleys of the Faroe Islands
1985 establishments in the Faroe Islands